CNU could stand for:

University
Capital Normal University, Beijing, China
Cebu Normal University,  Philippines
Chia Nan University of Pharmacy and Science, Tainan, Taiwan
Chonnam National University, Gwangju, South Korea
Christopher Newport University, Newport News, Virginia, US
Chungnam National University, Daejeon, South Korea

Police
 Crisis Negotiation Unit, a special police unit for hostage, barricade, and suicide situations
FBI Crisis Negotiation Unit
Singapore Police Force Crisis Negotiation Unit

Others
Cameroonian National Union, later Cameroon People's Democratic Movement
Congress for the New Urbanism
CNU (singer) (born 1991), Korean